Cathe Friedrich, born July 20, 1964, is an American ACE certified group fitness instructor, personal trainer and entrepreneur from Glassboro, New Jersey. Since releasing her first fitness video in 1989, Friedrich has released over 190 fitness videos. For several years she has taught fitness classes on the now defunct FitTV. She is the co-owner of Four Seasons Health Club in Glassboro, New Jersey, where she regularly teaches fitness classes. In 2011 she was inducted into the National Fitness Hall of Fame.

References

External links
"Cathe Friedrich on Step & Strength and Heart & Hustle" Perfection Detox Podcast with Petra Kolber, 14 March 2017

Living people
American exercise instructors
1964 births
People from Glassboro, New Jersey